Stamnodes blackmorei is a species of geometrid moth in the family Geometridae. It is found in North America.

The MONA or Hodges number for Stamnodes blackmorei is 7334.

References

Further reading

External links

 

Stamnodini
Articles created by Qbugbot
Moths described in 1915